Ruthergate is an old road near Guisborough in Redcar and Cleveland, England, now disused.  It leads southwards from Ruther Cross on Hutton Lane before winding up Kemplah Hill in a well-marked cutting.  It is mentioned in early charters, sometimes as Rechergate, sometimes as Rogergate.  It may have originally been created as an access road to a quarry on Highcliff.

References
 Guisborough Before 1900, B.J.D.Harrison and G.Dixon (editors), MTD Rigg Publications, Guiseley, Leeds, 2nd Edition, 1994.
 The Ruthergate in Guisborough, A.W.Armstrong, Cleveland and Teesside Local History Society Bulletin, 25, pages 39–42, 1974.

Ancient trackways in England
Archaeological sites in North Yorkshire
Guisborough